Exceptia sisterina is a moth in the family Gelechiidae. It was described by Powell and Povolný in 2001. It is found in North America, where it has been recorded from California.

References

Gnorimoschemini
Moths described in 2001